In Greek mythology, the name Phrastor (Ancient Greek: Φράστωρ) may refer to:

Phrastor, son of Pelasgus and Menippe, daughter of Peneus. He was the father of Amyntor, grandfather of Teutamides, and great-grandfather of Nanas.
Phrastor, in a rare version of the myth, son of Oedipus and Jocasta and brother of Laonytus. The brothers fought against Erginus of Orchomenus and fell in the battle.
Phrastor, victor of javelin throw during the first Olympic games established by Heracles.

Notes

References
 Dionysius of Halicarnassus. Roman Antiquities, Volume I: Books 1-2. Translated by Earnest Cary. Loeb Classical Library No. 319. Cambridge, Massachusetts: Harvard University Press, 1937. Online version by Bill Thayer. Online version at Harvard University Press.
 Fowler, R. L. (2000), Early Greek Mythography: Volume 1: Text and Introduction, Oxford University Press, 2000. .
 Pindar, Odes, Diane Arnson Svarlien. 1990. Online version at the Perseus Digital Library.

Princes in Greek mythology
Theban characters in Greek mythology
Minyan mythology